CTRL or Ctrl may refer to several things:

 Channel Tunnel Rail Link, a high-speed railway line opened in the 2000s in Britain
 Control key, an input button present on most computer keyboards
 CTRL (gene), a gene that in humans encodes the enzyme chymotrypsin-like protease CTRL-1
 Ctrl (web series), an American comedy web series from NBC
 Ctrl (Derek Webb album), a 2012 album by singer-songwriter Derek Webb
 Ctrl (SZA album), a 2017 album by singer-songwriter SZA
 CTRL (TV series), a 2021 Singaporean television drama
 Cyberoam Threat Research Labs, a facility of Cyberoam
 The stock symbol for Control4

See also
 Control-Alt-Delete (disambiguation)
 CNTRL, protein that in humans is encoded by the CNTRL gene
 CNTRL: Beyond EDM, a North American educational initiative, centered on electronic dance music